The 1973 New Jersey gubernatorial election was held on November 6, 1973. Incumbent Republican Governor William T. Cahill ran for reelection, but was defeated in the Republican primary by Charles W. Sandman Jr. In the general election, Democratic nominee Brendan Byrne defeated Sandman with 66.67% of the vote.

Primary elections were held on June 5. Sandman defeated Governor Cahill, whose reputation had been damaged by a series of corruption scandals, in a rematch of the 1969 Republican primary; his victory "shocked party leaders throughout the state." Byrne, a judge who had garnered a reputation for resistance to corruption, defeated Ann Klein and Ralph DeRose to win the Democratic nomination.

Byrne carried 20 of New Jersey's 21 counties, with Sandman only winning his native Cape May. , this remains the largest margin of victory and share of the vote for the Democratic Party in a gubernatorial election. This is the most recent gubernatorial election in which the Democratic nominee won Morris and Sussex counties, as well as the only time a New Jersey governor was defeated in the primary.

Background
In 1969, William T. Cahill defeated Charles W. Sandman Jr. in the Republican primary, with the winner almost assured of victory. The close race between the liberal Cahill and the conservative Sandman created a lasting rift between the two men personally and politically; he easily defeated former governor Robert B. Meyner in the general election.

Cahill was popular through most of his first two years in office, during which he quieted a rebellion at Rahway State Prison without violence and convinced the New York Giants to relocate to the New Jersey Meadowlands. He also signed into law new environmental protection and consumer protection regulations. He developed a national reputation as one of the most successful Republican Governors in the country. His popularity suffered a slight setback, particularly among conservatives, when he signed an increase in the state sales tax and proposed a further institution of the state's first income tax. He put the income tax issue directly to the voters in a July 1972 referendum but was defeated. Nevertheless, he remained popular enough among the party's liberal wing that some suggested Cahill should replace Spiro Agnew as Richard Nixon's running mate in 1972.

However, Cahill's administration began a precipitous decline in 1972, when Secretary of State Paul J. Sherwin, a long-time aide to Cahill from his days in Washington, was indicted, convicted and sentenced to one to three years in prison for rigging a $600,000 state highway contract in a scheme that kicked back $10,000 to Cahill's closest donors. The issue was compounded by the fact that charges were only brought after 18 months of delay, when U.S. Attorney Herbert J. Stern compelled state Attorney General George F. Kugler to prosecute. Though the State Commission of Investigation released a lengthy report criticizing Stern and exonerating Kugler, legislators in both parties considered the commission's ability to be subjective compromised, and Democratic leaders called the report a "whitewash."

The growing corruption scandal in the Cahill administration became more salient with New Jersey voters as a similar political corruption scandal played out on the national level: the break-in at the Watergate Hotel.

Republican primary

Candidates
William T. Cahill, incumbent Governor of New Jersey
Michael A. Maglio, Essex County Republican Committeeman
Charles W. Sandman Jr., U.S. Representative from Lower Township

Declined
Frederick B. Lacey, Judge and former U.S. Attorney of the United States District Court for the District of New Jersey

Charles Sandman remained a critic of Governor Cahill throughout his term in office, such that the two were known as the party's "most outspoken political enemies." By fall 1972, Sandman was publicly criticizing Cahill by name in earnest.

On February 17, after months of failing to recruit another Republican challenger, Sandman formally announced he would challenge Cahill's renomination at a secretive meeting of Republican leaders in Trenton. He said he was running to give "better leadership to both the state and Republican Party" and called for an open primary without county organization endorsements. It was his third announced campaign for Governor, after losing the primary in 1965 and 1969.

Campaign
Before Cahill even entered the race, Sandman charged that renominating him would destroy the New Jersey Republican Party and ensure that Democrats won both houses of the Legislature. "According to the Democrats, Cahill's re-election campaign will make The Perils of Pauline seem like a situation comedy," he said. Some Republicans interpreted Sandman's projection that Cahill was doomed in the general election as an invitation for a conservative third party to bolt the Republican ticket, in the event Cahill was renominated.

Ideological contest
Sandman also challenged Cahill on ideological grounds, criticizing Cahill's first-term record and presenting himself as a conduit for conservative reaction. He said he would campaign on education, transportation, and the increasing burden of crime and taxes. He also opposed Cahill's efforts to mandate school integration via busing and challenge restrictive zoning laws.

Sandman's strategy was predicated on the belief in an emerging conservative majority in the state, which Sandman adviser F. Clifton White attributed to Richard Nixon's landslide re-election in the state. Cahill contested this view, maintaining that New Jersey was still a liberal state and that "to be against is not enough."

Gross and McCrane scandals
Sandman made an early issue of the Sherwin scandal, predicting that if he did not criticize and defeat Cahill, the Democratic Party would make a major issue of corruption in the fall. Cahill did not shy from the issue of corruption, demanding in March that the entire election should constitute a public referendum on the question of his personal honesty. In his campaign announcement, he referred to himself in the third person, "If the public believes that there is any corruption in Bill Cahill or anybody associated with Bill Cahill, then they shouldn't vote for Bill Cahill."

In April, the cloud of corruption around Cahill grew larger. Two high-ranking members of his 1969 campaign, state party chairman Nelson G. Gross and New Jersey Treasurer Joseph McCrane, were accused of illegally masking contributions to the campaign as tax deductions. (Both were later indicted and convicted.) McCrane was also indicted for bribery and misconduct in office in an alleged conspiracy to have several large banks and the State Division of Investment, which was under his control, purchase millions of securities through his brother, a Manhattan securities broker. Though Cahill was never personally implicated in the scandals, he had personally pledged to "search out" political corruption during the 1969 campaign and in his inaugural address, and his reputation suffered greatly.

Endorsements
Cahill retained the endorsements of nearly every Republican legislator and the editorial support of New Jersey's leading newspapers, though he lost the support of liberal U.S. Senator Clifford Case, who had backed him twice before.

Results

On election night, Sandman defeated Cahill easily. Cahill wished Sandman "sincere congratulations," but declined to make any pledge of support. "I stand before you with my head high tonight. I came in fighting and I went out fighting," he said to supporters. "I look back with a feeling that all I did and all that those around me did was the best of our ability. We tried to contribute something to New Jersey."

In his victory speech, Sandman claimed a "mandate" for conservatism. He renewed his campaign offer to nominate Brendan Byrne, now his general election opponent, as a special prosecutor against political corruption, saying there was "no better person for that office."

Sandman's victory, which came despite the entire state establishment remaining loyal to Cahill, "shocked party leaders throughout the state." His victory was compared to Barry Goldwater's 1964 nomination for President. Liberal Republicans projected Sandman would meet the same fate: landslide defeat. One aide to Governor Cahill remarked, "The Republicans are like lemmings marching into the sea. They are determined to commit political suicide."

Democratic primary

Candidates
Vito Albanese, former State Assemblyman from Fort Lee
Brendan Byrne, Essex County Superior Court judge and former county prosecutor
Ralph DeRose, State Senator from South Orange
Frank Forst, union leader and Mayor of Jamesburg
Ann Klein, State Assemblywoman from Morristown

Withdrew
Richard J. Coffee, State Senator from Lawrence (endorsed Byrne)
J. Edward Crabiel, State Senator from Milltown

Initially, Cahill's chances for re-election looked so strong, and his popularity among Democrats and liberal-minded independents was so strong, that a number of potential Democratic candidates could not be persuaded to run. However, with the Gross and McCrane scandals breaking three weeks before the April 26 filing deadline, Byrne decided at the eleventh hour to enter the campaign with the support of the Hudson County. His entry instigated the withdrawal of Senator Richard J. Coffee. J. Edward Crabiel came under similar pressure to stand aside for Byrne and was initially resistant but soon withdrew.

Campaign
During the campaign, Byrne hammered hard on the issue of corruption, relying on his reputation as "the man who couldn't be bought" by organized crime. Coffee joined his campaign almost immediately upon his withdrawal, bringing many influential supporters, including Richard C. Leone.

Byrne's alliance with the Hudson County party organization, typically seen as a political machine and often a hub of corruption, posed an issue for him early in the campaign. He publicly favored an open primary without the "county line" endorsement that often proved decisive, but said given that DeRose was running on the Essex County line, he would maintain the "standoff."

Results

At his victory celebration in East Orange, Byrne said the voters had showed "the people have held the Governor accountable" for surrounding himself with corrupt aides. Klein conceded but claimed her candidacy had struck a blow for women's liberation. "We have expanded the horizon of every little girl in the United States," she said.

General election

Candidates
Jack D. Alvino (Independent) 
Brendan Byrne, Essex County Superior Court judge (Democratic)
Robert Clement (Socialist Labor)
Alfred V. Colabella (Independent) 
A. Howard Freund (American)
George Gilk (Defeat Narcotics Crime)
John A. Goodson (Libertarian)
Stanley R. Knis (Tax Repeal)
Angelo S. Massaro (People's Choice)
Kenneth F. Newcombe (Communist)
Charles W. Sandman Jr., U.S. Representative from Lower Township (Republican)
James J. Terlizzi, Sr. (Independent Taxpayer's Watchdog)

Results

References

1973
New Jersey
Gubernatorial
November 1973 events in the United States